Yenisey also spelled Yenisei and Enisey, is a Russian women's volleyball club based in Krasnoyarsk. The club was founded in 1992 and currently plays in the super league, the top Russian league.

Previous names
 Sibiryachka (1992–1995)
 Nika (1995–1997)
 Bogur (1997–2000)
 Yeniseyushka (Eniseyushka) (2000–2003)
 Metrostroy (2003–2004)
 Stroytel (2004–2010)
 Yonost (2010–2012)
 Yenisey (Yenisei / Enisey) (2012–present)

History
It has changed names many times (Nika, Bogur, Yeniseyushka, Metrostroy, Yonost) and has been competing mainly in the lower leagues of the Russian Championship and the Cup of Siberia and Far East. It played at the Super League for the first time in the 2004–05 season and finished last.

In January 2012 the club came under the professional structure of Volleyball Club Yenisey and was renamed .

Team Roster
Season 2020–2021, as of December 2020.

References

External links
Official site 

Russian volleyball clubs
Volleyball clubs established in 1992
1992 establishments in Russia
Sport in Krasnoyarsk